Yearsett railway station was a station to the southeast of Brockhampton, Herefordshire, England. The station was opened on 2 May 1874 as a temporary terminus and closed on 22 October 1877.

References

Further reading

Disused railway stations in Herefordshire
Railway stations in Great Britain opened in 1874
Railway stations in Great Britain closed in 1877